Quentin Jean Henri Lendresse (born 6 March 1990) is a former French professional footballer. He is a versatile midfielder and can play as attacking midfielder or forward.

References

External links

Quentin Lendresse at HKFA

1990 births
Living people
Association football midfielders
French footballers
French expatriate footballers
Hong Kong Rangers FC players
Hong Kong Premier League players
Expatriate footballers in Hong Kong
French expatriate sportspeople in Hong Kong
Sportspeople from Neuilly-sur-Seine
Footballers from Hauts-de-Seine